Mocis xylomiges is a species of moth of the family Erebidae. It is found in Indonesia (Sulawesi, Java).

References

Moths described in 1880
Mocis
Moths of Indonesia